Pastilla dacuna is a species of freshwater crab in the monotypic genus in the family Gecarcinucidae. It is endemic to Sri Lanka. Its natural habitats are subtropical or tropical moist lowland forests, subtropical or tropical swamps, and rivers. It is threatened by habitat loss.

References

Gecarcinucidae
Crustaceans of Sri Lanka
Freshwater crustaceans of Asia
Taxonomy articles created by Polbot
Crustaceans described in 2001